China Fire was a series of three Chinese rock music samplers compiled primarily from Beijing artists. These albums were issued by Taiwan-based label Rock Records during the early stages of Chinese rock in the 1990s. Many of the featured songs appeared on albums by their respective creators, while other groups and their songs never made it past the sampler.

China Fire I

China Fire II

China Fire III

References

1992 albums
Sampler albums
Rock albums by Chinese artists